Dona Isabel of Braganza (1514 – 16 September 1576) was a member of the House of Braganza, daughter of Jaime, Duke of Braganza (a nephew of Manuel I of Portugal) and Leonor Pérez de Guzmán.

Marriage
Isabel married her cousin Infante Duarte a son of Manuel I and Maria of Aragon in 1537. Isabel was dowried with the Dukedom of Guimarães, which had belonged to her brother Teodósio I, Duke of Braganza. After the marriage, Infante Duarte became the 4th Duke of Guimarães.

Her younger daughter Catherine became the Duchess of Braganza and had a claim to the throne of Portugal. She was also part of the succession crisis.

Issue 
This marriage produced three children:
Mary of Guimarães (1538–1577), married Alessandro Farnese, Duke of Parma and Piacenza.
Infanta Catherine of Guimarães (1540–1614), Duchess of Braganza, married to John, 6th Duke of Braganza, she was a claimant of the throne of Portugal in 1580 (See: 1580 Portuguese succession crisis).
Infante Duarte II, 5th Duke of Guimarães (1541–1576)

Ancestry

External links 

1514 births
1576 deaths
Isabel
16th-century Portuguese people
Portuguese duchesses
16th-century Portuguese women